Chordeleg is a town and parish and seat of Chordeleg Canton, Azuay Province, Ecuador.

Chordeleg is well known for its jewelry industry, especially gold and silver filigree jewelry.

See also
For more details, see the Wikipedia in Spanish.Cantón Chordeleg

References

Populated places in Azuay Province
Parishes of Ecuador